William Robinson Leigh (September 23, 1866 – March 11, 1955) was an American artist and illustrator, who was known for his painted Western scenes.

Biography 
William Robinson Leigh was born on September 23, 1866, at Maidstone Manor Farm, Berkeley County, West Virginia. He entered the Maryland Institute for the Promotion of the Mechanic Arts (now known as Maryland Institute College of Art) at age 14, then attended the Royal Academy in Munich. He returned to the United States after twelve years abroad and worked painting cycloramas and as a magazine illustrator. An example is the cover illustration of the August 4, 1904 Leslie's Weekly featuring a policeman "Piloting Children to Safety at a Crowded New York Crossing."

He married twice, and fathered William Colston Leigh, Sr. (1901–1992). His first wife was Anna Seng Leigh, mother of his son, their marriage ended in a divorce sometime before 1906. His second wife was Ethel Traphagen Leigh (1883–1963), was the founder of Traphagen School of Fashion in New York City.

In 1906, Leigh traveled to the American West and maintained a studio in New York City. In 1926 he travelled to Africa at the invitation of Carl Akeley for the American Museum of Natural History, and from this experience wrote and illustrated Frontiers of Enchantment: An Artist's Adventures in Africa. In 1933, he wrote and illustrated The Western Pony. His adventures were chronicled in a number of popular magazines including Life, the Saturday Evening Post, and Colliers.  He is known for painting the Grand Canyon and Yellowstone National Park, but his primary interest were the Hopi and Navajo Indians. In 1953 he was elected into the National Academy of Design as an Associate member and became a full Academician in 1955.

Leigh also made astrobiological art for the March 1908 issue of Cosmopolitan, with four full-page illustrations of an article written by H. G. Wells, "The Things that Live on Mars", which speculated about Martian life. Science fiction writer Edmond Hamilton, born October 1904, described looking and re-looking at the issue as a defining experience in his life. "I wasn't yet able to read it, to read the article, but those pictures!"

After his death, Leigh's New York studio was given to the Gilcrease Museum in Tulsa, Oklahoma.

References

Leigh, William Robinson, Autobiography, (MSS SC 171), L. Tom Perry Special Collections, Harold B. Lee Library, Brigham Young University.

External links

 Biography at Medicine Man Gallery
 Artist Bio at Ackerman's Fine Art, LLC
Bears in the Path (Surprise), 1904 at Sid Richardson Museum – with biography
The Hold Up (The Ambush), 1903 at Sid Richardson Museum
 
Artwork by William Leigh

1866 births
1955 deaths
Artists of the American West
People from Hedgesville, West Virginia
19th-century American painters
American male painters
20th-century American painters
Artists from West Virginia
Federal Art Project artists
19th-century American male artists
20th-century American male artists